Al-Qahtaniyah, formerly Qubur al-Bid, is a town in northeastern Al-Hasakah Governorate, northeastern Syria. It is the administrative center of al-Qahtaniyah Subdistrict, which consists of 103 localities. Historically an Assyrian city, at the 2004 census, it had a population of 16,946.

Etymology
Al-Qahtaniyah was officially called Qbor el-Bid until 1962. Its old name was derived from the Arabic words "Qbor" ("graves") and "el-Bid" ("white") – i.e. "white graves."

Demographics 
The majority of the towns inhabitants are Kurds, followed by a large number of Assyrians and Arameans.

Churches in the town
 Syriac Orthodox Church of Our Lady (كنيسة السيدة العذراء للسريان الأرثوذكس)

History

In 1927, the Kurdish tribal chief Haco Agha of the influential Haverkan tribe immigrated from Turkey together with more than 600 families and settled in the town.
On 13 March 2004, after the 2004 Qamishli riots when 40 Kurdish civilians were killed, residents of Al-Qahtaniyah who protested the killings were shot at and injured by Syrian forces.

As of 2004, Al-Qahtaniyah is the sixth largest town in Al-Hasakah governorate.

In late July 2012, during the civil war, the YPG took control of the town.

Notable people
 Ciwan Haco (1957*), Kurdish singer
 Muhammad Khayr Ramdan Yusef

See also
 Assyrians in Syria
 Kurds in Syria

References

Populated places in Qamishli District
Towns in al-Hasakah Governorate
Assyrian communities in Syria
Kurdish communities in Syria